Chris Hall (September 17, 1950 – December 21, 2014) was a lacrosse player and coach.  He was inducted into National Lacrosse League Hall of Fame in 2014 and the Canadian Lacrosse Hall of Fame as builder in 2015. As a coach in the National Lacrosse League, he won the Champion's Cup with the Calgary Roughnecks and Washington Stealth.

Hall co-won the Les Bartley Award with Derek Keenan as the NLL coach of the year in 2010.  He won the Mann Cup with the Victoria Shamrocks three times: twice as a coach and once as a player.

He is survived by his sister, Janice, wife Pam Harknett, stepsons Brock and Drew Henson, and step-granddaughters Georgia, Annika, and Leni Henson.

References

1950 births
2014 deaths
Deaths from cancer
National Lacrosse League coaches
National Lacrosse League major award winners
Calgary Roughnecks coaches